Siege of Fort Henry may refer to:
 Siege of Fort William Henry, a 1757 siege during the French and Indian War on the frontier between the British Province of New York and the French Province of Canada
 Siege of Fort Henry (1777), a siege during the American Revolutionary War, in Virginia
 Siege of Fort Henry (1782), a siege during the American Revolutionary War, in Virginia

See also
Battle of Fort Henry, a battle in 1862 during the American Civil War in Middle Tennessee
Fort Henry (disambiguation)